Mordellistena dahomeyana is a beetle in the genus Mordellistena of the family Mordellidae. It was described in 1955 by Franciscolo.

References

dahomeyana
Beetles described in 1955